The following is a list of all team-to-team transactions that have occurred in the National Hockey League during the 1980–81 NHL season. It lists what team each player has been traded to, signed by, or claimed by, and for which player(s) or draft pick(s), if applicable.

Trades between teams

May

June

July

August

September

October

November

December

January

February 

 Trade completed on June 9, 1982, at the 1982 NHL Entry Draft.
 Trade completed on May 28, 1981.

March 
 Trading Deadline: March 10, 1981 

 Trade completed on May 12, 1981.

Additional sources
 hockeydb.com - search for player and select "show trades"

References

National Hockey League transactions
1980–81 NHL season